The 2021–22 EuroLeague Women was the 64th edition of the European women's club basketball championship organized by FIBA, and the 26th edition since being rebranded as the EuroLeague Women.

In February 2022, the Russian teams (UMMC Ekaterinburg, Dynamo Kursk, and MBA Moscow) were expelled from the tournament by FIBA for the Euroleague Women playoffs, and suspended, due to Russia's invasion of Ukraine.

Sopron Basket won its first-ever championship after defeating Fenerbahçe in the final of the Final Four.

Team allocation
A total of 20 teams from 10 countries will participate in the 2021–22 EuroLeague Women.

Teams
League positions of the previous season shown in parentheses (TH: EuroLeague Women title holders; EC: EuroCup Women title holders).

Referees

Round and draw dates

Schedule

Draw
The draw was held on 19 August 2021 in Freising, Germany.

Draw rules are as follows.

 A maximum of two clubs from the same country can be in the same Regular Season group for countries that have up to three clubs in total.
 Each group can have a maximum of two countries that are represented by two clubs each.
 If there are exactly two clubs from the same country, those clubs shall be drawn into different groups if possible.

Qualifying round

Conference 1

Conference 2

Regular season

Group A

Group B

Quarterfinals

|}

Final Four

Bracket

Awards

EuroLeague Final Four MVP
 Gabby Williams ( Sopron Basket)

MVP of the Month

See also 
 2021–22 EuroCup Women

References

External links
 

2021–22 in European women's basketball leagues
EuroLeague Women seasons